Sheer Mag is an American rock band from  Philadelphia formed in 2014. A combination of 1970s rock and punk ethos, the band continued to gather attention, releasing three 7-inch EPs before March 2016. In January 2015, Rolling Stone featured the band as one of "10 New Artists You Need To Know", describing them as "a gang of punks with a not-so-secret love of Seventies classic rock." Four of five band members attended the State University of New York at Purchase. In 2016, the band was part of the Coachella 2016 line-up and performed on Late Night with Seth Meyers. On May 10, 2017, Sheer Mag released "Need To Feel Your Love", the first track off their first full-length record, Need to Feel Your Love. On June 19, 2019, they announced their second LP, A Distant Call.

History
Sheer Mag's core members—Christina Halladay, Matt Palmer, and siblings Kyle and Hart Seely—all met while studying at SUNY Purchase. After graduating they all moved to Philadelphia and formed the band in 2014. They all moved into a house together, referring to their home as 'The Nuthouse', where they recorded their debut self-titled 7-inch EP later that year. It was released on their own label, Wilsons RC, in September 2014.

Following its positive reception they went on their first full U.S. tour the next spring, with their EP finding a UK/EU release with London punk label Static Shock Records - a relationship that would continue for future releases.

They released their second EP in April 2015, this time a co-release with Brooklyn label Katorga Works. In March 2016 they released a third 7-inch vinyl EP. In early 2017 Wilsons RC and Static Shock released a compilation LP covering all songs from their previous releases.

On May 10, 2017, Sheer Mag released the title track off their first full-length record, Need to Feel Your Love, which came out 14 July.

On June 19, 2019, they announced their second LP, A Distant Call would be released on August 23 the same year.

The track "Expect the Bayonet" from Need to Feel Your Love served as the walkout track for Bernie Sanders at a comeback presidential campaign rally in Queens, New York during October 2019. The RollingStone politics podcast Useful Idiots uses the same track as its theme music.

Members

Current members
Christina Halladay – vocals (2014–present)
Matt Palmer – rhythm guitar, keyboards (2014–present)
Kyle Seely – lead guitar, backing vocals (2014–present); drums (2019–present; only studio)
Hart Seely – bass (2014–present)

Touring members
Giacomo Zatti – drums (2017–present)

Past members
Ian Dykstra – drums
Allen Chapman – drums
Cameron Wisch – drums

Discography

Studio albums
 Need to Feel Your Love – Wilsuns Recording Company (USA) / Static Shock (UK), 12-inch LP, CD, MP3 (2017)
 A Distant Call – Wilsuns Recording Company (USA) 12-inch LP, CD, MP3 (2019)

EPs
 I – Wilsuns Recording Company (USA), 7-inch EP, Cassette, MP3 (2014) / Static Shock (UK), 7-inch EP, MP3 (2015)
 II – Wilsuns Recording Company / Katorga Works (USA), 7-inch EP, Cassette, MP3 / Static Shock (UK), 7-inch EP, MP3 (2015)
 III – Wilsuns Recording Company (USA), 7-inch EP, Cassette, MP3 / Static Shock (UK), 7-inch EP, MP3 (2016)

Compilation albums
 Compilation (I, II & III) – Wilsuns Recording Company (USA) / Static Shock (UK), 12-inch LP, CD, MP3 / Get Better Records (USA), Cassette (2017)

Live albums
 Live! - Shout Recordings (USA), Cassette, MP3 (2019)

References

External links
 Sheer Mag on Bandcamp

Musical groups established in 2014
Indie rock musical groups from Pennsylvania
Musical groups from Philadelphia
2014 establishments in Pennsylvania